Expressivity, expressiveness,  and expressive power may refer to:

Expressivity (genetics), variations in a phenotype among individuals carrying a particular genotype
Expressive loa, a type of loanword in phono-semantic matching
Expressive power (computer science) of a programming language
Expressive suppression, an aspect of emotion regulation
Expressive therapies, the use of creative arts as therapy
Expressive timing, musical phenomenon

See also
 Expression (disambiguation)